Saule Tarikhovna Omarova (Säule Tarihqyzy Omarova, Kazakh Cyrillic: Сәуле Тарихқызы Омарова; born November 2, 1966) is a Kazakh-American attorney, academic, and public policy advisor. She was the nominee for comptroller of the currency before her nomination was withdrawn at her request on December 7, 2021.

Omarova is the Beth and Marc Goldberg Professor of Law at Cornell Law School, where her work focuses on financial regulation and corporate governance. Omarova previously served as an advisor within the Department of the Treasury. She is a Senior Berggruen Fellow at the Berggruen Institute in Los Angeles.

Early life and education 
Omarova was born in the West Kazakhstan Region of the Kazakh Soviet Socialist Republic, stating in a 2020 interview with Chris Hayes that she "went to high school in a small, tiny Kazakh provincial town on the outskirts of the Soviet Empire." Omarova grew up in an all female household in the city of Oral. Her mother was a doctor at a local hospital that treated tuberculosis patients and she was chiefly raised by a grandmother, who, Omarova stated, was orphaned when her entire family was sent to Siberia under Stalin's rule. 

Omarova studied at Oral's School No. 21 before moving to Moscow in 1984, where she was the first student to graduate from the school with a "gold medal", an academic distinction which was awarded to a tiny fraction of students in the Soviet Union. Omarova graduated from Moscow State University in 1989 on the Lenin Personal Academic Scholarship.

Her thesis from MSU is titled "Karl Marx's Economic Analysis and the Theory of Revolution in The Capital". Omarova moved to the United States in 1991, "with one suitcase and a fifty-dollar bill in my pocket". She received a Ph.D in political science from the University of Wisconsin–Madison (UW), and a Juris Doctor from Northwestern University Pritzker School of Law. At UW, Omarova defended her thesis, The Political Economy of Oil in Post-Soviet Kazakhstan.

Career 
Omarova practiced law in the Financial Institutions Group of New York-based law firm Davis Polk & Wardwell for six years. During the George W. Bush Administration, Omarova served in the Department of the Treasury as a special advisor on regulatory policy to the Under Secretary for Domestic Finance. During her time as an associate professor of law at the University of North Carolina at Chapel Hill, Omarova was a witness at a U.S. Senate hearing on bank ownership of energy facilities and warehouses.

Omarova joined the Cornell Law School in 2014. She was professor of law and public affairs from July 2014 to June 2019 and has been the Beth and Marc Goldberg Professor of Law since June 2019.

OCC Nomination
In August 2021, Omarova's name was floated as a potential contender to lead the Office of the Comptroller of the Currency (OCC) under President Joe Biden. She was chosen to serve as comptroller of the currency in September 2021, pending Senate confirmation. Her confirmation hearings occurred before the Senate Banking Committee on November 18, 2021. Omarova's nomination was endorsed by Senator Elizabeth Warren, who stated she would be a "fearless champion for consumers" in the role if confirmed.

Her nomination was criticized by credit unions and bank lobbyists. Republicans were critical of her 2021 paper "The Peoples Ledger"  in which Omarova proposes that the Federal Reserve should provide consumer banking services. Senator Patrick Toomey has called her ideas "extreme leftist" and Senator John Kennedy said to her, "I don't know whether to call you 'professor' or 'comrade.'" 

The Editorial Board of The Wall Street Journal argued that “the U.S. doesn't need a bank regulator who wants to end banking as we know it, or who wants to create a central bank digital currency.” Omarova had also faced opposition from some Democratic Senators, including Jon Tester, Joe Manchin and Kyrsten Sinema. On December 7, 2021, it was announced that Omarova's nomination had been withdrawn.

Policy positions

National Investment Authority 
Omarova is noted for her support for a "National Investment Authority" (NIA), a proposal she has likened to New Deal-era programs. The proposal was first developed in 2015 in conjunction with Robert C. Hockett, a fellow professor of law at Cornell Law School. Omarova has stated that the NIA would be responsible for "devising, financing, and executing a long-term national strategy of economic development and reconstruction." In 2020, Omarova wrote a report for think tank Data for Progress, where she stated the "Green New Deal (GND) movement has successfully propelled [a] programmatic vision of an environmentally clean, just, and equitable future."

The proposed NIA would be made up of two components: a "National Infrastructure Bank" (NIB), as well as a National Management Corporation (which she nicknames "Nicki Mac"), which would serve to invest in green technologies. A 2020 article published in The New York Times reported that the proposed NIA would function in a manner similar to the Federal Reserve, and compared the NIA framework to the Reconstruction Finance Corporation created in 1932.

Federal Reserve reform 
In a 2021 paper "The People's Ledger: How to Democratize Money and Finance the Economy", she proposed "a comprehensive reform of the structure and systemic function of the Fed's balance sheet as the basis for redesigning the core architecture of modern finance. In essence, it offers a blueprint for democratizing both access to money and control over financial flows in the nation's economy." She called for the Federal Reserve to offer consumer bank accounts and become "the ultimate public platform for generating, modulating, and allocating financial resources in a modern economy" in a move she has called a radical reform.

Financial regulation 
According to a report by The New York Times, Omarova favors stricter regulations on cryptocurrencies and financial technology (fintech) companies. In response to reports that Facebook may launch its own cryptocurrency, Omarova argued it was an example of "Big Tech companies [resorting] to ever more creative ways to expand a monopolistic and extractive business model under the guise of corporate activism." In a paper by Omarova published in the Yale Journal on Regulation, "New Tech v. New Deal: Fintech as a Systemic Phenomenon" (2019), she argued that some financial technology applications have served as "destabilizing mechanisms".

References 

Kazakhstani emigrants to the United States
Cornell Law School faculty
21st-century American women lawyers
21st-century American lawyers
Living people
Progressivism in the United States
Moscow State University alumni
Northwestern University Pritzker School of Law alumni
United States Department of the Treasury officials
University of Wisconsin–Madison alumni
Biden administration personnel
American women academics
People from Almaty Region
1966 births
Davis Polk & Wardwell lawyers